West Portal is a small neighborhood in San Francisco, California. West Portal is a primarily residential area of the City. The neighborhood's main corridor, West Portal Avenue, serves as a principal shopping district of southwestern San Francisco.

Location
West Portal is located at the southern edge of the hills in central San Francisco. The neighborhood is named for the western terminus of the Muni tunnel beneath Twin Peaks that opened in 1918. The ride in the subway from West Portal Station to Castro Station is about seven minutes. By the West Portal Station, the L Taraval goes west along Ulloa Street, and the K Ingleside and the M Ocean View go south along West Portal Avenue.

Characteristics
Because of its small size and collection of mom and pop stores, restaurants, and saloons, the neighborhood is often described as having a village-like atmosphere. The neighborhood is served by the West Portal Branch of the San Francisco Public Library. Like Glen Park, West Portal is a San Francisco community that almost functions as a small city itself. Though small, the neighborhood has many banks, restaurants of many types, coffee shops, salons, post office, elementary school, drug stores, bakeries, ice cream shops, real estate agents, and spas. West Portal Avenue is dotted with locally owned and operated businesses which include a book store, toy and craft store, produce market, candy shop, and hardware store. West Portal Avenue also has many professional services such as dentists, lawyers, accountants, optometrists, and urgent care facilities.

The frequent fog helps keep the area green in the usually rainless summer months, and on a clear day, West Portal Park, above the Twin Peaks Tunnel, provides a view of the Marin Headlands and the Farallon Islands in the Pacific.

Transit
The neighborhood is served by the Muni train lines L Taraval, M Ocean View, S Shuttle, K Ingleside and T Third Street.

References

Neighborhoods in San Francisco
Shopping districts and streets in the United States
Streetcar suburbs